Florian Cazalot, (born 22 April 1985 in Aire-sur-l'Adour, Landes) is a rugby union player, who plays as prop or hooker for FC Lourdes (1.83 m, 106 kg).

Before joining FC Lourdes in 2009, Cazalot had represented Section Paloise since the 2005/06 season.

Honours

International
 Under 18 internationals: three games in 2003 (Wales, Scotland, England).
 Under 21 internationals:
 2004 : Played in the World Championships in Scotland, two games (Italy, Argentina).
 2006 : Called up to the World Championships in France, under Damien Weber, but did not play
 2 caps, 1 try in 2005-2006 (Ireland, Wales)

Notes

1985 births
Living people
Sportspeople from Landes (department)
French rugby union players
Rugby union props
Rugby union hookers